Jacob Benjamin "Jake" Goldsbie (born August 8, 1988) is a Canadian actor, who is best known for playing as Toby Isaacs in the CTV television series Degrassi: The Next Generation from 2001 until 2009.

Biography
Goldsbie graduated from Concordia University in Montreal where he studied theatre.  Goldsbie works at The Score where he writes and podcasts about professional sports. In 2001, Goldsbie plays Toby Isaacs in Degrassi: The Next Generation, although he originally auditioned for the role of J.T. Yorke.  Goldsbie is Jewish.

Filmography
 Molly's Game (2017)
 Being Erica (2010)
 Twitches (2005)
 I Do, They Don't (2005)
 Childstar (2004)
 The Red Sneakers (2002)
 Prince Charming (2001)
 Anne of Green Gables: The Animated Series (2001)-voice
 Degrassi: The Next Generation (2001–2009)
Main cast (seasons 1–5, 2001–2006)
Recurring cast (seasons 6–7, 2006–2008)
Guest appearance (season 8, 2009)
 Leap Years (2001)
 Laughter on the 23rd Floor (2001)
 Pecola (2001)-voice
 When Andrew Came Home (2000)
 Redwall (2000)-voice
 Jacob Two Two Meets the Hooded Fang (1999)
 Black and Blue (1999)
 Critical Choices (1996)

References

External links
 

1988 births
Canadian male child actors
Canadian male stage actors
Canadian male television actors
Canadian male voice actors
Jewish Canadian male actors
Living people
Male actors from Toronto
21st-century Canadian male actors